Michael Christopher Flanagan (born November 10, 1973) is a former American football center who played twelve seasons in the National Football League (NFL).  He played college football for the University of California, Los Angeles (UCLA).  In the third round of the 1996 NFL Draft, the Green Bay Packers selected him as the 90th overall pick.  Flanagan played from 1998 to 2005 with the Packers then with the Houston Texans from 2006 to 2007.

Early life and college
Flanagan was born in Washington, D.C. and graduated from Rio Americano High School in Sacramento, California in 1991. He is of Irish descent.  At UCLA, Flanagan redshirted in 1991, played one game in 1992, and started 32 consecutive games from 1993 to 1995. He was a first-team All-Pac-10 selection in his junior and senior seasons and third-team All-America recognition as a senior. Flanagan became a starter in 1993 after Jonathan Ogden, a future NFL player, was injured. In 2002, he graduated from UCLA with a Bachelor of Arts degree in history. For three years, Flanagan earned a spot on the UCLA athletic director's academic honor roll.

Professional career

Green Bay Packers
In the 1996 NFL Draft, the Green Bay Packers selected Flanagan in the third round as the 90th overall pick. Flanagan sat out the 1996 and 1997 seasons due to an injury sustained during the 1996 preseason.

Although the Green Bay Packers traded Flanagan to the Carolina Panthers in August 1998, the trade was nullified because Flanagan did not pass a physical. With the Packers, Flanagan made his professional regular season debut on December 13, 1998, a victory over the Chicago Bears. Flanagan became the starting center in 2001. Flanagan was named to the Pro Bowl for the first time in 2003, the first Packers center to be named since 1996. Flanagan sat out the season after October 2004 due to knee surgery.

Houston Texans
On March 24, 2006, Flanagan signed with the Houston Texans. He was released by the Texans on February 20, 2008.

References

External links
Houston Texans bio (as of Jan. 2008)

1973 births
Living people
Players of American football from Sacramento, California
Players of American football from Washington, D.C.
American people of Irish descent
American football centers
UCLA Bruins football players
Green Bay Packers players
National Conference Pro Bowl players
Houston Texans players